OXC may refer to:

 Optical cross-connect
 Waterbury-Oxford Airport